The Micro-DVI port is a proprietary video output port found in the original MacBook Air. It is smaller than the Mini-DVI port used by its MacBook models.

To use the port for displaying video on a standard monitor or television, an adapter must be used. Both a Micro-DVI to DVI adapter and a Micro-DVI to VGA adapter were bundled with the original MacBook Air. A Micro-DVI to Video adapter, which provided composite and S-video outputs, was also sold separately. The Micro-DVI to DVI adapter is only compatible with a DVI-D (digital) signal; DVI-A and DVI-I signals do not work as they do not have the required analog connections.

The Micro-DVI connector was replaced with the Mini DisplayPort connector starting with the Late 2008 MacBook Air, making it one of the shortest lived connectors created by Apple.

Additionally, the Asus U2E subnotebook includes a "Micro-DVI" port, which unlike the Apple version has the same form factor as HDMI.

Although it is electrically compatible with HDMI, it does not provide audio output.

See also
 List of video connectors

External links
 

Digital display connectors